The International Student Science Fair (ISSF) is an annual event providing a platform for international interaction to take place in science education. The fair brings together talented science high school students who are passionate in mathematics and science, teachers and school leaders to share and develop the learning and teaching of science research and education.
The ISSF is the major event of its type in the world, bringing together students, teachers, school and university leaders to share and develop their ideas about science in the modern world.

History of ISSF 
 2005 — Mahidol Wittayanusorn School, Bangkok, Thailand (2005)
 2006 — Korea Science Academy, Busan, Republic of Korea (August 2006)
 2007 — City Montessori School, Lucknow, India (August 2007)
 2008 — Ritsumeikan Senior High School, Kyoto, Japan (October 2008)
 2009 — National Junior College, Singapore (May 2009)
 2010 — Australian Science and Mathematics School, Adelaide, Australia (September 2010)
 2011 — Mahidol Wittayanusorn School, Bangkok, Thailand (September 2011)
 2012 — Fort Richmond Collegiate, Winnipeg, Canada (24-30 April 2012)
 2013 — Camborne Science & International Academy, Camborne, United Kingdom (11-16 July 2013)
 2014 — Moscow Chemical Lyceum, Moscow, Russian Federation (8-12 August 2014)
 2015 — John Monash Science School, Melbourne, Australia (December 2015)
 2016 — NUS High School of Math and Science, Singapore (May 2016)
 2017 — Korea Science Academy, Busan, South Korea (June 2017)
 2018 — Illinois Mathematics and Science Academy, Aurora, Illinois, United States (June 2018)
 2019 — National Junior College, Singapore (March 2019)
 2020 — Kamnoetvidya Science Academy, Rayong, Thailand (January 2020)
 2021 — The High School Affiliated to the Beihang University, Beijing, China
 2022 — Lewiston-Porter High School, Lewiston, New York, United States
 2023 — Queensland Academy for Science, Mathematics and Technology, Australia

Participating schools
Australia
 Australian Science and Mathematics School
 John Monash Science School
 Queensland Academy for Science, Mathematics and Technology
 Aberfoyle Park High School
Suzanne Cory High School

Canada
 Fort Richmond Collegiate
China
 The High School affiliated to BeiHang University
Hong Kong SAR
 Ho Yu College and Primary School (Sponsored by Sik Sik Yuen)
India
 City Montessori School
Indonesia
 Budi Mulia Dua International High School
 Center for Young Scientists (affiliated to Surya University)
Iran
 Manzoumeh Kherad Institute
Japan
 Tokyo Tech High School of Science and Technology
 Ritsumeikan Junior and Senior High School
 Ritsumeikan Keisho Junior and Senior High School
 Ritsumeikan Uji High School
 Toyonaka High School
Kenya
 Brookhouse School
Macau
 Keang Peng School
Malaysia
 Alam Shah Science School
 Kepala Batas Secondary Science School
Mongolia
 New Beginning International School
Netherlands
 St.-Odulphuslyceum
Philippines
 Philippine Science High School
Republic of Korea
 Korean Minjok Leadership Academy
 Korea Science Academy of KAIST
Russian Federation
 Moscow Chemical Lyceum
 Lyceum "Physical-Technical High School"
Singapore
 National Junior College
 NUS High School of Math and Science
 School of Science and Technology, Singapore
Taiwan
 Kaohsiung Municipal Kaohsiung Girls' Senior High School
Thailand
 Chulalongkorn University Demonstration Secondary School
 Mahidol Wittayanusorn School
 Kamnoetvidya Science Academy
United Kingdom
 Camborne Science and International Academy
 Lancaster Girls' Grammar School
United States of America
 Illinois Mathematics and Science Academy
 West Aurora High School
 Lewiston-Porter High School

References

Science competitions